Mechain, a cantref in the Kingdom of Powys.

Mechain may also refer to:

Gwerful Mechain, a female Welsh poet of the later Middle Ages, from Mechain
Pierre Méchain, a French astronomer